Summer Vibe is the second extended play by South Korean girl group Viviz. The EP was released by BPM Entertainment on July 6, 2022, and contains six tracks, including the lead single "Loveade".

Composition and lyrics
Song "Siesta" is described as a pop dance song with 90s style guitar riffs.Song "love love love" was produced as a song in an uptempo deep house genre.Song "#flashback" was produced as an urban R&B song in a new jack swing vibe with retro synth pads, with metaphors associated with hashtags.Song "dance" is described as a ballad track adorned with minimalist instruments and "spatial effectors".

Background and release
On June 23, 2022, BPM Entertainment announced Viviz would be releasing their second extended play titled Summer Vibe on July 6. Two days later, the promotional schedule was released. On June 26, the track listing was released with "Loveade" announced as the lead single. On July 1, the first mood sampler video titled "Flying Point version" was released, followed by a second mood sampler video titled "Ready to Summer version" a day later. On July 3, the album preview teaser video was released. The music video teaser for "Loveade" was released on July 4 and 5.

Promotion
Following the release of Summer Vibe, Viviz held a live showcase on the same date to introduce the extended play and communicate with their fans.

Track listing

Charts

Weekly charts

Monthly charts

Release history

Notes

References

Viviz albums
2022 EPs
Korean-language EPs